URBN Hotel Shanghai is a boutique hotel located in Jing'an District in Shanghai, China. It is the first "carbon neutral hotel" in China: to be declared such, it is a part of the Cachet Hotel Group.

History  
The 26-room hotel is a converted 1970's former post office building, designed by A00 Architecture. By renovating an existing structure, focusing on using recycled and locally sourced materials such as reclaimed hardwoods and old Shanghai bricks, implementing eco-friendly solutions like passive solar shades and a water-based air conditioning system, URBN Hotel Shanghai is one of the first examples of how to create a more ecological hotel establishment.

Guest rooms 
 Studio room
 
 room
 Garden view
 Penthouse

Restaurants 
 URBN Restaurant

External links
 Urbn Hotel, Shanghai - The Cool Hunter

References 

Hotels in Shanghai